Idionyx rhinoceroides is a species of dragonfly in the family Synthemistidae. It is known only from a single female collected from type locality (Dhoni, Palakkad, Kerala) in the Western Ghats of India.

Description
It is a small dragonfly with emerald-green eyes. Its thorax is metallic emerald-green, coated with yellow hairs on dorsum. Humeral stripe is absent. There is a narrow oblique citron-yellow stripe traversing the spiracle and another bordering the lower part of metepimeron. Beneath the side is yellow, with an oblique bluish-black stripe and a triangular blackish-brown spot. Abdomen is black. The ventral borders of segments 2 and 3 are citron-yellow.

This species can be easily distinguished from all other species by the unique shape of its vesicle.

See also
 List of odonates of India
 List of odonata of Kerala

References

Synthemistidae
Taxa named by Frederic Charles Fraser